Hacıalılar may refer to:
 Hacıalılar, Gadabay, Azerbaijan
 Hacıalılar, Shamkir, Azerbaijan